Alexandre Leduc is a Canadian politician, who was elected to the National Assembly of Quebec in the 2018 provincial election. He represents the electoral district of Hochelaga-Maisonneuve as a member of Québec solidaire.

Background 
Leduc worked as a teaching assistant and historian while studying at the Université du Québec à Montréal.
Prior to being elected in 2018, Leduc served as an advisor to the Public Service Alliance of Canada, and later the Québec Federation of Labour (FTQ).

Electoral record

References 

Living people
1984 births
Politicians from Montreal
People from Longueuil
People from Mercier–Hochelaga-Maisonneuve
Québec solidaire MNAs
21st-century Canadian politicians
Université du Québec à Montréal alumni
Trade unionists from Quebec